Bat Hefer (lit. Daughter of Hefer) is a community settlement in the Sharon plain in Israel. Located east of Netanya and adjacent to two kibbutzim; Bahan and Yad Hana, it covers 1,000 dunams and falls under the jurisdiction of the Hefer Valley Regional Council. The village is between the Highway 6 highway to the west and the Green Line on the east.

Etymology
Bat Hefer is named after "Hefer," an administrative district in this area with a district chief in the time of King Solomon (1 Kings 4:10).

History
Bat Hefer was founded as "Sokho" and named after the ancient town by the same name. Construction of the modern village began in 1995, and the first residents moved in during 1996. It was built as part of the Seven Stars project.

The locality was constructed mostly on lands belonging to the depopulated village of Qaqun, as well as lands belonging to the villages Deir al-Ghusun and Shwiaka on the other side of the Green Line

References

Community settlements
Populated places established in 1996
Populated places in Central District (Israel)
1996 establishments in Israel